Micromonospora lupini is an endophytic actinomycete notable for producing antitumour anthraquinones: lupinacidins A (1), B (2) and C. Its genome has been sequenced.

References

Further reading

External links

LPSN
Type strain of Micromonospora lupini at BacDive -  the Bacterial Diversity Metadatabase

Micromonosporaceae
Bacteria described in 2007